Bourne are a series of three novels by Robert Ludlum based on the fictional spy Jason Bourne.  The series has since been further extended by Eric Van Lustbader after the death of Robert Ludlum. When Eric Van Lustbader decided to stop writing the Bourne novels during the writing of The Bourne Nemesis, Brian Freeman was approached by the Ludlum estate to continue the stories of Jason Bourne.

Novels by Ludlum
The original three Bourne novels are:
The Bourne Identity (1980)
The Bourne Supremacy (1986)
The Bourne Ultimatum (1990)

Novels by Eric Van Lustbader
The continuation novels are:

The Bourne Legacy (2004)
The Bourne Betrayal (2007)
The Bourne Sanction (2008)
The Bourne Deception (2009)
The Bourne Objective (2010)
The Bourne Dominion (2011)
The Bourne Imperative (2012)
The Bourne Retribution (2013)
The Bourne Ascendancy (2014)
The Bourne Enigma (2016)
The Bourne Initiative (2017)
The Bourne Nemesis (abandoned)

Novels by Brian Freeman
The Bourne Evolution (2020)
The Bourne Treachery (2021)
The Bourne Sacrifice (2022)
The Bourne Defiance  (2023)

Treadstone Novels by Joshua Hood
A new series, inspired by Robert Ludlum's Bourne universe and centered on Adam Hayes, another Treadstone agent, began publication in 2020, written by Joshua Hood:
The Treadstone Resurrection (2020)
The Treadstone Exile (2021)
The Treadstone Transgression (2022)

Films and TV

The Bourne Identity has been adapted into live action twice. The first adaptation is a 1988 television film starring Richard Chamberlain and Jaclyn Smith. The second is a 2002 feature film series starring Matt Damon, which proved to be a strong critical and commercial success, launching the Bourne film series, which consists of five films, with the fifth being released in July 2016. The television series  Treadstone was connected to and based on the book series. The show was created by Tim Kring and premiered October 15, 2019. In May 2020, the series was canceled after one season.

References

 
Book series introduced in 1980
Novel series
American novels adapted into films
Novels adapted into video games